Afton Municipal Airport  is a town-owned, public-use airport located one nautical mile (1.85 km) southwest of the central business district of Afton, a town in Lincoln County, Wyoming, United States. It is also known as Afton-Lincoln County Airport.

This airport is included in the FAA's National Plan of Integrated Airport Systems (2009–2013), which categorizes it as a general aviation airport.

Facilities and aircraft 
It has one runway designated 16/34 with an asphalt surface measuring 7,023 by 75 feet (2,141 x 23 m).

For the 12-month period ending May 31, 2019, the airport had 9,016 aircraft operations, an average of 25 per day: 97% general aviation and 3% air taxi. At that time there were 44 aircraft based at this airport: 91% single-engine, 2% multi-engine, and 7% jet.

References

External links 
 Afton Flight Services, the fixed-base operator (FBO)
 Aerial photo as of 23 August 1994 from USGS The National Map
 
 

Airports in Wyoming
Buildings and structures in Lincoln County, Wyoming
Transportation in Lincoln County, Wyoming